Washington Camp is a populated place in Santa Cruz County, Arizona, United States. Little remains of the historic mining camp and what does is on private property belonging to the community's few remaining residents. The Mad Miner Inn has lodging, checkout availability and location on maps. The ruins of the ghost town of Duquesne are one mile southeast of Washington Camp.
The post office in Washington Camp was first opened on May 13, 1880, and moved to nearby Duquesne on June 6, 1890.

See also

 List of ghost towns in Arizona

References

External links
 Washington Camp – ghosttowns.com

Ghost towns in Arizona
Populated places in Santa Cruz County, Arizona
1880 establishments in Arizona Territory
History of Santa Cruz County, Arizona